Palmquist, Palmqvist or Palmkvist is a Swedish surname. Notable people with the surname include:
Palmquist
Bengt Palmquist (1923–1995), Swedish sailor
Björn Palmquist, Swedish sailor, son of Bengt
Ed Palmquist (1933–2010), American baseball pitcher
Gustaf Palmquist (1812–1867), Swedish Baptist pioneer
Hans Palmquist (born 1967), Swedish association football defender
Johan Palmquist, Swedish sailor, son of Bengt, brother of Björn
Oscar Palmquist (born 1963), Brazilian member of the World Scout Committee
Zach Palmquist (born 1990), American ice hockey defenseman 
Stephen Palmquist, Kantian philosopher

Palmqvist
Arne Palmqvist (1921–2003), Swedish theologian
Bengt-Olov Palmqvist, Swedish-Australian musicologist and music theorist
Björn Palmqvist (born 1944), Swedish ice hockey player
Jenny Palmqvist (born 1969), South Korean–born Swedish association football referee
Lars Palmqvist, Swedish orienteering competitor
Per Palmqvist (1815–1887), Swedish Baptist pioneer, brother of Gustaf Palmquist
Wäinö Palmqvist (1882–1964), Finnish architect

See also
Palmqvist method

Swedish-language surnames